Discoptera is a genus of beetles in the family Carabidae, containing the following species:

 Discoptera arabica Fairmaire, 1896
 Discoptera eylandi Semenov, 1889
 Discoptera komarowi Semenov, 1889
 Discoptera przewalskii Semenov, 1889
 Discoptera tschitscherini Semenov, 1895

References

Lebiinae